Mullipattu is a village located in Arani, Tiruvannamalai, India.

Mullipattu was formerly called Mullai Vanam, which means forest. The main work of the villagers is weaving and agriculture.

References 

Tiruvannamalai district